"" is the 37th single by Zard and released 12 November 2003 under B-Gram Records label. The single debuted at #8 rank first week. It charted for 10 weeks and sold over 50,000 copies.

Track list
All songs are written by Izumi Sakai

composer: Aika Ohno/arrangement: Daisuke Ikeda
Aika Ohno was participating in chorus part
Takeshi Hayama re-arranged this song in 2012 in Zard Album collection (Premium Disc)

composer: Makoto Miyoshi (ex. Rumania Montevideo)/arrangement: Satoru Kobayashi
 (original karaoke)

References

2003 singles
Zard songs
2003 songs
Songs written by Izumi Sakai
Songs written by Aika Ohno